The Portrait of Ippolito de' Medici is a 1532-33 portrait of Ippolito de' Medici by Titian, now in the Palazzo Pitti. He is "in the dress of an Hungarian horseman."

References

Ippolito
Ippolito
1533 paintings
Paintings in the collection of the Galleria Palatina